Kathy Mulholland (June 2, 1941 – July 9, 1989) was an American speed skater. She competed in the women's 500 metres at the 1960 Winter Olympics.

References

1941 births
1989 deaths
American female speed skaters
Olympic speed skaters of the United States
Speed skaters at the 1960 Winter Olympics
Sportspeople from the Bronx
20th-century American women